Broncia Koller-Pinell (25 February 1863 – 26 April 1934) was an Austrian Expressionist painter who specialized in portraits and still-lifes.

Life 
She was born as Bronisława Pineles to a Jewish family in Sanok in what is now Poland. Her father, was a designer of military fortifications. In 1870, they moved to Vienna to start a manufacturing business (where they changed the family name to "Pinell") and she took private art lessons with Alois Delug. In 1885, she had her first public exhibition. For the next five years, she studied in Munich at the "Damenakademie" of the Munich Artists' Association in the studios of Ludwig von Herterich. This was followed by exhibitions at the Vienna Künstlerhaus, in Munich and in Leipzig. Koller-Pinell  exhibited her work at The Woman's Building at the 1893 World's Columbian Exposition in Chicago, Illinois.  

Their children were raised as Christians, but she never converted. At first, they lived in Salzburg and Nuremberg, but returned to Vienna in 1902. Shortly after, she was accepted as a member of the Vienna Secession. In 1904, she inherited a house in Oberwaltersdorf. The family soon moved there, and she had it decorated by Josef Hoffmann and Koloman Moser, associates from the Secession. Shortly after, she set up a salon that was frequented by Egon Schiele, Anton Faistauer and Albert Paris Gütersloh, among others.

Her son, Rupert (1896–1976), became a conductor and was briefly married to Anna Mahler. Her daughter Silvia (1898–1963) was also a painter.

Koller-Pinell died in Oberwaltersdorf on 26 April 1934.

Her work was included in the 2019 exhibition City Of Women: Female artists in Vienna from 1900 to 1938 at the Österreichische Galerie Belvedere.

Selected paintings

References

Further reading 
 Die Malerin Broncia Koller 1863–1934. Exhibition catalog, Niederösterreichisches Landesmuseum, Vienna (1980)
 Tobias G. Natter: Broncia Koller Pinell. Eine Malerin im Glanz der Wiener Jahrhundertwende. Exhibition catalog. Jüdisches Museum, Vienna (1993)
 Boris Manner: Broncia Koller-Pinell 1863–1934. Brandstätter, Vienna (2006)

External links 

 ArtNet: More work by Koller-Pinell
 Wien-Vienna Website: "On the Career of Broncia Koller", a book review by Susanne Neuberger
 Broncia Koller-Pinell @ The Blue Lantern
 

1863 births
1934 deaths
20th-century Austrian women artists
People from Sanok
Artists from Vienna
Austrian women painters
Austrian Jews
Expressionist painters
Jewish women painters
Jewish painters